Souba is a village and rural commune in the Cercle of Ségou in the Ségou Region of southern-central Mali. The commune contains 24 villages in an area of approximately 1,104 square kilometers. In the 2009 census it had a population of 17,961. The village of Souba, the chef-lieu of the commune, sits on the left (north) bank of the Niger River.

References

External links
.
.

Communes of Ségou Region